Eastport is an unincorporated community in Tuscarawas County, in the U.S. state of Ohio.

History
Eastport was laid out and platted in 1833. A post office called Eastport was established in 1835, and remained in operation until 1849.

References

Unincorporated communities in Tuscarawas County, Ohio
Unincorporated communities in Ohio